Innocent Ujah Idibia  MON (born 18 September 1975), known by his stage name 2Baba, is a Nigerian singer, songwriter, record producer, entrepreneur and philanthropist. Noted for his vocal range, lyrical depth, and longevity, he is widely regarded as one of Nigeria's greatest musicians of all-time. He is most influential for the rise in popularity of Nigerian pop music in the 2000s, and his solo debut album Face2Face (with the smash hit "African Queen") ushered in a new wave of awareness and reverence for Nigerian music amongst Africans on the continent and in diaspora. Prior to July 2014, he went by the stage name 2face Idibia. 2Baba is the first winner of MTV EMA Best African Act category in 2005, and is one of the most awarded Nigerian musicians in history.

In 2019, 2Baba, in collaboration with other well-known artistes like Cohbams Asuquo and Timi Dakolo, released a song for awareness of the rights of children.

He was part of a boys group called Plantashun Boiz, under God Father Production.

Early life 

Innocent Ujah Idibia was born in Jos. He is from the Idoma ethnic group in the southern part of Benue State, in central Nigeria. He attended Mount Saint Gabriel's Secondary School in Makurdi, Benue State. Tuface enrolled at the Institute of Management & Technology, Enugu (IMT), where he did his preliminary National Diploma course in Business Administration and management. While attending IMT, Idibia performed at school organised shows and parties, as well as other regional schools such as the University of Nigeria and Enugu State University of Science & Technology. He eventually dropped out of school to pursue his music career. While attending IMT, 2face Idibia started composing and singing jingles at the GB Fan Club at Enugu State Broadcasting Services (ESBS) in 1996.

Also in 1996, he adopted the stage name "2Face" (Tuface). He cited the reason as "trying to demarcate my personal life from my business life".

In 2016, he officially changed his name from Tuface to 2Baba.

In Plantashun Boiz 

He moved to Lagos and started performing with fellow Benue singer Blackface Naija. He met Blackface during his secondary school education. With Blackface (Ahmedu Augustine Obiabo) and with musician Faze (Chibuzor Orji), he went on to form the trio band called Plantashun Boiz.

Plantashun Boiz released two successful albums: Body and Soul (2000) and Sold Out (2003) under Nelson Brown's label (Dove Records) before disbanding in 2004. Relations were marred for many years during which the band broke up and its members started their solo careers. Long after the break-up known as the "Faze vs Tuface" beef, the band came back together in 2007 for the purpose of recording a third and final album entitled Plan B (2007).

On numerous occasions, BlackFace claimed 2Baba was performing songs co-written by both of them and not remitting revenues to him. After a long legal and media battle, the matter was finally laid to rest amicably.

Solo career 

After the disbandment of Plantashun Boyz in 2004, all band members sought separate musical careers. 2Baba released his debut solo album Face 2 Face (2004), which has been listed by many publications as the greatest Nigerian debut album of the 21st Century by a solo artist. The album spurned hits like "Nfana Ibaga", "Ole", and "African Queen" (which has been touted as one of the biggest hits to come out of Africa and served as the sound track to the 2006 Hollywood movie Phat Girlz).

Following the release of his debut album, he released his second album Grass 2 Grace in 2006, which contained hits likes "One Love", "True Love, "4 Instance".

2Baba released an experimental album in 2009 called The Unstoppable which includes the single "Enter the Place". Problems with album distribution in 2007 caused a shift of the release date of the album from 2008 to early 2009. In 2010, 2Baba released an "International Edition" of the same album with the title The Unstoppable International Edition making him the first Nigerian artist to have an appropriately priced international album. 2face released two more singles from the international version of his  The Unstoppable album. The international edition of the album won two awards at the 2010 SoundCity Music Video Awards. 2Baba also won the Channel O Music Video Awards,Best African Western award and the MTV Africa Music Awards for Best Male and Artist of the year.

Upon leaving the music label Kennis Music after the release of his second solo album, he set up his own record label known as Hypertek Digital. He is part of the Sony All African One8 Project alongside seven other musicians across Africa recording a single with R. Kelly and Prince Lee titled "Hands Across the World".

Endorsement deal 

2Baba, in August 2016, became the first African ambassador of Italian alcoholic liqueur Campari. In 2005, he was named as an ambassador of Guinness beer. He is also the brand ambassador for National Agency for Food and Drug Andministration and Control. In 2010, 2Baba signed an endorsement deal with Airtel Nigeria. When his contract with Airtel expired, he signed a new endorsement deal with Globacom telecommunication in May 2019. 2Baba was made the brand ambassador of Pazino Homes and Gardens, a real estate firm, in July 2019. Tuface alongside Wizkid was chosen as the face of Hennessy artistry season in 2014. In 2019, 2Baba became the first and official brand ambassador for Oraimo.

2Baba signed an endorsement deal with real estate brand, pazino homes and garden as he is now there brand ambassador.

FORTYfied All-Star Tribute Concert 

The FORTYfied All-Star Tribute Concert, stylised as #FORTYfied, was an all-star tribute concert organised by 2Baba to celebrate his 40th birthday and influence in the music of Nigeria. Hosted by Basketmouth, the STAR Lager Beer-sponsored concert was held on 20 September 2015 at the Eko Hotel and Suites Convention Centre. The concert was attended by dignitaries and featured performances from notable musicians including Wizkid, Burna Boy, Timaya, D'banj, Sound Sultan, Patoranking, Vector tha Viper, Wande Coal and Seyi Shay.

He is also the owner of the Buckwyld and Breathless concert.

Personal life and marriage 

2Baba is married to Nigerian award-winning actress, movie producer, model and serial entrepreneur Annie Idibia (née Macauley). On 2 May 2012, 2Baba and Annie Macaulay married in Lagos, Nigeria in a private ceremony. A civil ceremony was also held in Dubai, UAE on 23 March 2013 and had a high attendance of celebrities.

The celebrity couple are parents to two girls: Olivia Idibia and Isabella Idibia.

While in a relationship with his then-girlfriend-turned-wife Annie Macaulay–Idibia, 2Baba fathered two children with Sumbo Ajala and three with Pero Adeniyi. 2face has a total of seven children.

2Baba has survived near-death events, including gunshots from an armed robbery incident near Oshodi, Lagos.

Philanthropy 

2Baba has established an NGO called the 2Baba Foundation. whose motto is "service to humanity". Formerly known as the 2Face Reach out Foundation, and eventually the 2Face Foundation, the foundation underwent a name change in September 2016, and is now known as the 2Baba Foundation. The foundation's work is centered around nation building, peaceful co-existence, and accountability in governance.

In 2009, 2Baba was appointed as ambassador by the National Agency for Food and Drug Administration and Control (NAFDAC). He released the song "Man Unkind" to raise awareness of the menace of fake and sub-standard food and drug products in Nigeria. In 2009, Idibia was presented with the prestigious International Youth Ambassador for Peace Summit and the Nigeria Youth Merit Award by the National Youth Council of Nigeria in recognition of his contributions to youth development in Nigeria.

In January 2017, 2Baba announced a partnership with United Nations High Commissioner for Refugees (UNHCR). He made an initial donation of over US$11,000 to UNHCR for IDPs and returnees. In June 2017, he released a dedicated IDP-awareness song titled Hold My Hand to mark the World Refugee Day, and promised 60 percent of the proceeds from the song to the IDP cause. He has also collaborated with other NGOs like The Nigerian RedCross Society, Enough is Enough (EiE)(Office of the Citizen campaign), Youngstars Foundation and National Democratic Institute (for Vote Not Fight campaign).

2baba on Tuesday inaugurated a multi-million Naira music studio and donated it to the Obafemi Awolowo University.

On 23 June 2020, Idibia was appointed as the new Regional Goodwill Ambassador of the United Nations High Commission for Refugees (UNCHR). He was the first Nigerian to receive this kind of appointment from UNHCR.

Social crusade and activism 

2Baba has over the years lent his voice to the voice of the oppressed using his celebrity status to bring more awareness to issues of governance in his country and in Africa at large. In April 2021, he chided the Nigeria Centre for Disease Control (NCDC) for frustrating travelers by collecting a mandatory fee (about N50,000 – fifty thousand naira) for COVID-19 arrival test on the NCDC's portal and the portal not delivering the necessary QR codes needed for this test. Many travelers were stranded because of this.

Controversies 

Tuface has been part of a lot of controversies throughout his career. In 2004, Tuface's exit from the band Plantashun Boiz led to the split of the group, instigating a feud with his former bandmates who blamed him for the disbandment. Tuface and former bandmate Faze traded blames in various tracks in their respective solo albums.

The hit song "African Queen" became a subject of controversy between Tuface, his record label Kennis Music, and former bandmate Blackface, who publicly accused Tuface of stealing the song from him; alleging that he wrote the song while they were still a band. Kennis Music eventually agreed to give Blackface writing credits for the song, and also agreed to pay him loyalties from the proceeds of the song.

On 25 January 2017, Tuface made an announcement through his Instagram handle that he would be leading a nationwide protest on 5 February 2017; the protest was against policies implemented by the Muhammadu Buhari administration. In a way to stop the protest, the administration through the Lagos state police commissioner Fatai Owoseni, released a statement that the protest was banned in the state, stating that hoodlums would hijack it and use the protest to cause havoc, the statement was rebuffed and ignored publicly why publicity of the protest continued on social media.

On 4 February 2017, Tuface released a video that he was cancelling the protest due to security reasons but rumors circulated on social media have it that the administration, through the DSS picked him up earlier that day and pressured him to cancel the much-hyped protest, though he later made a series of tweets from his official Twitter account to deny the claim.

Discography

Albums 

 2004: Face 2 Face
 2006: Grass 2 Grace
 2009: The Unstoppable
 2010: The Unstoppable International Edition
 2012: Away & Beyond
 2014: The Ascension
 2020: Warriors

Awards 

2Baba has received one MTV Europe Music Award, one World Music Award, five Headies Awards (Hip-hop award), four Channel O Music Video Awards and one BET award for his musical work, four MTV Africa Music Awards, one MOBO award, one KORA award, 3 Afrima Awards, and numerous additional nominations.

In May 2016, 2Baba received an honorary Master of Arts in Music degree from Igbinedion University, Okada, Edo State, Nigeria.

In March 2019, he was awarded an honorary fellow of the school of music by the Music Department, Obafemi Awolowo University. This made him the pioneer recipient of the award which was presented to him at the first public lecture and fellowship award, held on 20 March 2019.

In August 2019, 2Baba was appointed as the good cause Ambassador for the Nigerian Stock Exchange (NSE).

See also 
 List of Nigerian musicians

References

External links 
 

1975 births
Living people
English-language singers from Nigeria
Idoma people
MTV Europe Music Award winners
Musicians from Benue State
Musicians from Enugu
Musicians from Jos
Musicians from Lagos
Nigerian hip hop singers
21st-century Nigerian male singers
Nigerian male singer-songwriters
Nigerian music industry executives
Nigerian reggae musicians
Nigerian rhythm and blues singer-songwriters
Reggae fusion artists
Singers from Lagos
The Headies winners
World Music Awards winners
Yoruba-language singers